Teresa del Carmen Incháustegui Romero (born 15 March 1952) is a Mexican politician from the Party of the Democratic Revolution. From 2009 to 2012 she served as Deputy of the LXI Legislature of the Mexican Congress representing the Federal District.

Early life and career 
Inchuesetegui holds bachelor degree in Sociology from the National Autonomous University of Mexico (UNAM) and a PhD in Political Science with a specialization in Social Policy from the Latin American Faculty of Social Sciences (FLACSO-Mexico). 

In 2014, she was appointed as the new director of the Institute of Women of the Federal District by the head of the capital Miguel Ángel Mancera.

References

External links
Fighting Machismo, interview with Teresa Incháustegui in Digital Development Debates, June 2016.

1952 births
Living people
Politicians from Mexico City
Women members of the Chamber of Deputies (Mexico)
Party of the Democratic Revolution politicians
21st-century Mexican politicians
21st-century Mexican women politicians
Members of the Chamber of Deputies (Mexico) for Mexico City